= Gisostola melancholica =

Scientific classification
- Kingdom: Animalia
- Phylum: Arthropoda
- Clade: Pancrustacea
- Class: Insecta
- Order: Coleoptera
- Suborder: Polyphaga
- Infraorder: Cucujiformia
- Family: Cerambycidae
- Genus: Gisostola
- Species: G. melancholica

Binomial name
- Gisostola melancholica (Thomson, 1857)

Species of beetle

Gisostola melancholica is a species of beetle in the family Cerambycidae. It was described by Thomson in 1857. It is known from Brazil (Minas Gerais, Espírito Santo, Rio de Janeiro, Paraná).
